= Bybee Peak =

Mountain in Oregon, United States

- Location within Oregon

Highest point
- Elevation: 2,631 ft (802 m)
- Coordinates: 42.3909288°N 122.7223635°W

Naming
- Etymology: William Bybee

Geology
- Mountain type: Summit

Bybee Peak is a summit in the U.S. state of Oregon. The elevation is 2,631 feet (802 m).

Bybee Peak has the name of one William Bybee.
